William B. Ide Adobe State Historic Park is a California State Historic Park located on the west bank of the Sacramento River, a mile north of Red Bluff in Tehama County, California. Although it was initially believed that Ide built the adobe, research has shown that he never lived in the place that bears his name today. Nevertheless, the State of California decided to keep the name of the park in recognition of Ide's role in California history.

William B. Ide 
The park memorializes William Brown Ide, a California pioneer, captain of the Bear Flag Revolt and the only president of the California Republic, which lasted from June 14 to July 9, 1846.

Adobe 

A. M. Dibble, an early settler in Red Bluff, built the adobe in 1852.  There were approximately 20 different property owners up to 1942.  A. Mount and Willette Mount owned the property for the longest period which was from 1882 to 1913.  William B. Ide has incorrectly been credited to being one of the property owners, though he never owned the property or lived in the adobe; Mr. Ide actually owned land downriver from the adobe property.  It was decided in 1940s to make the adobe site into a state park. The state of California acquired the land in the 1950s, and the park was dedicated in 1960.  The park was named after William B. Ide to honor his contribution to California's history.

New museum 
The park includes a restored adobe housing a museum, and a recreated 1850s homestead, with replicas of a typical schoolhouse, wood shop, and blacksmith shop, as well as a small visitor center.  A picnic area overlooks the Sacramento River.  There are several interpretive program events scheduled throughout the year:  Ide's Ferry Championship Horseshoe Pitchers Contest in June, Adobe Day in September,  and a Pioneer Christmas Party in December. School programs are also offered to students visiting the museum: "Life in the 1850s", which is an all-day program, and "Mini-Life in the 1850s", which is a 1–2 hour program.  Volunteers in Parks is another program which encourages visitors to become volunteers at the park.  Additional interpretive programs include demonstrations of pioneer crafts and period parties, as well as performances by the Ide Adobe Players, a Gold Rush-era band, and Gold Rush Gambling, which gives visitors to the park an opportunity to play faro, monte, shut the box and other games which were common during that time.

Gallery

See also 
 National Register of Historic Places listings in Shasta County, California
 List of California State Historic Parks

References

External links 
 William B. Ide Adobe State Historic Park

Museums in Tehama County, California
History of Shasta County, California
California State Historic Parks
Open-air museums in California
Historic house museums in California
History of Tehama County, California

Parks in Tehama County, California